Anastasia Ilyinichna Bliznyuk (born 28 June 1994) is a Russian group rhythmic gymnast. She is a two-time 2012 and 2016 Olympics Group All-around champion and 2020 Olympics Group All-around silver medalist, 2017 World Group All-around champion, 2013 World Group All-around bronze medalist, and three-time European (2012, 2016, 2018) Group All-around champion. Bliznyuk is the third group rhythmic gymnast to win two gold medals in the Olympic Games after the late Natalia Lavrova and Yelena Posevina and the only rhythmic gymnast to win three medals in the Olympic Games.

Personal life 
Anastasia is the daughter of former football player Ilya Bliznyuk who played for the Ukrainian national team and was the head coach of FC Zirka Kirovograd. She has an elder sister named Alexandra and a younger brother named Vladimir.

Career 

Bliznyuk was part of the gold medal winning Russian Group at the 2012 European Championships and at the World Cup Final in Minsk, Belarus. She won a gold medal at the 2012 Summer Olympics in the group all-around event together with other group members (Uliana Donskova, Ksenia Dudkina, Alina Makarenko, Anastasia Nazarenko, Karolina Sevastyanova).

For six months leading up to the Olympic Games, the Russian gymnasts only ate buckwheat in their diet. Bliznyuk is a resident of the city of Penza.

Bliznyuk suffered an injury at the start of the 2013 season and was not selected to compete with the Russian Group, she returned to competition in the Russian Group at the 2013 Sofia World Cup where they won the silver medal in all-around and gold in 2 ribbons/3 balls final. At the Minsk World Cup they won gold in all-around, silver in 2 ribbons/3 balls and bronze in 10 clubs. Bliznyuk and the rest Russian Group won all the gold medals at the 2013 Summer Universiade in All-around, 10 clubs and 2 ribbons/3 balls. The Russian Group won the gold medals in Group All-around, 10 clubs and 2 ribbons/3 balls at the 2013 World Cup Final in St. Petersburg, Russia. Bliznyuk and her Russian teammates won the Group All-around bronze medal at the 2013 World Championships, they won gold in 2 Ribbon + 3 Balls final. Bliznyuk along with rest of the remaining Russian Group Olympians terminated their careers after the World Championships. Irina Viner stated about their dismissal and retirements: "We have made drastic changes in the composition of the group. All the girls, who a year ago at the Olympic Games were the first after the World Cup series had to say goodbye to the sport. They did not show in Kyiv what could and should have been shown. The "star disease" should not be left on the carpet. And I always say that as long as you're standing on a pedestal - you're a winner, but as soon as you had gone down from it - you're no one to call you in any way".

In 2014 Bliznyuk suffered an infection and spent about six weeks in recovery. After returning to health, she switched to a coaching role with a Russian reserve team. She came back to training in 2015.

In 2016, Bliznyuk made a competitive comeback, she was included in the Russian group and returned to competition at the 2016 Moscow Grand Prix. She also began competing at the 2016 FIG World Cup series events. Bliznyuk and the Russian group won group gold at the 2016 European Championships in Holon, Israel. 

On August 19–21, Bliznyuk was member of the golden winning Russian group (together with Anastasia Maksimova, Maria Tolkacheva, Vera Biryukova, Anastasiia Tatareva) that won gold at the 2016 Summer Olympics held in Rio de Janeiro, Brazil. Bliznyuk achieved a rare feat by becoming only the third group rhythmic gymnast to win two gold medals in the Olympic Games after the late Natalia Lavrova and Yelena Posevina.

In 2017, Bliznyuk continued her competitive career and stayed with the Russian national group where she became the team captain. They competed at the 2017 Grand Prix Moscow where they won gold in group all-around, 3 balls + 2 ropes and silver medal in 5 hoops. They participated at the 2017 Pesaro World Cup finished 4th in all-around and qualified in 1 apparatus final, winning silver with 3 balls and 2 ropes. Then they also competeted at the 2017 Tashkent World Cup winning gold in all-around and qualified in all apparatuses finals, winning gold with hoops and bronze with balls and ropes. She and her team participated at The Alina Festival. They participated at the 2017 Portimao World Cup : they made a sweep of silvers behind Italy. They competed at the 2017 Grand Prix Holon winning silver in the all-around competition and golds in the events final.
They also participated at the 2017 Guadalajara World Cup winning gold in all-around and with balls and ropes. They also competed at the 2017 Berlin World Cup and made a sweep of golds. They made their last World Cup at the 2017 Kazan World Cup and made a second sweep of golds, in a row. At the 2017 World Championships in Pesaro, they won Gold in all-around and with balls and ropes, and silver with hoops.

In 2018, Bliznyuk began her season at the 2018 Grand Prix Moscow: they won gold in group all-around, 3 balls + 2 ropes and silver medal in 5 hoops. She suffered an injury but she came back at the 2018 Grand Prix Holon winning gold in all-around and with balls and ropes. They competed at the 2018 European Championships in Guadalajara, Spain winning gold in the all-around competition and bronze with 5 hoops.

On July 5, 2021, the Russian Federation announced that Bliznyuk was selected to represent Russia at the Tokyo 2020 Olympic Games, (its third Olympic Games) as a member of the Russian group formed by Anastasia Tatareva, Alisa Tishchenko, Anastasia Maksimova and Angelina Shkatova, and that the Russian group will compete in the World Challenge Cup Moscow 2021 from July 9 to 11. At the Moscow Cup, the Russian group took gold in all respects ahead of Japan and all possible golds in the apparatus finals ahead of Uzbekistan. From August 7 to 8, the Russian group competed in the 2020 Olympics where they achieved the silver medal in general competition behind Bulgaria, and it is the first time in 25 years that Russia has lost the first place and the gold medal at the Olympics.

From October 29 to 31, she competed in the 2021 Rhythmic Gymnastics World Championships, in Kitakyushu, Japan, (her third world championship) together with the team formed by Alisa Tishchenko, Maria Tolkacheva, Polina Orlova and Angelina Shkatova and won gold in the team competition for the fifth time in a row, ahead of Italy and Belarus. They also won team gold (along with individuals, Dina and Arina Averina), gold in the 5-ball final, and silver (behind Italy) in the mixed final.

Detailed Olympic results

References

External links
 
 

1994 births
Living people
Russian rhythmic gymnasts
Olympic gymnasts of Russia
Olympic gold medalists for Russia
Olympic silver medalists for the Russian Olympic Committee athletes
Olympic medalists in gymnastics
Gymnasts at the 2012 Summer Olympics
Medalists at the 2012 Summer Olympics
Gymnasts at the 2016 Summer Olympics
Medalists at the 2016 Summer Olympics
Gymnasts at the 2020 Summer Olympics
Medalists at the 2020 Summer Olympics
Sportspeople from Penza
Medalists at the Rhythmic Gymnastics World Championships
Medalists at the Rhythmic Gymnastics European Championships
Universiade medalists in gymnastics
Universiade gold medalists for Russia
Medalists at the 2013 Summer Universiade
Sportspeople from Zaporizhzhia